Nicholas Hamilton Barton  (born 30 August 1955) is a British evolutionary biologist.

Education
Barton was educated at Peterhouse, Cambridge where he graduated with a first-class degree in Biological Sciences (Cambridge) in 1976 and gained his PhD supervised by Godfrey Hewitt at the University of East Anglia in 1979.

Career
After a brief spell as a lab demonstrator at the University of Cambridge, Barton became a Lecturer at the Department of Genetics and Biometry, University College London, in 1982. Professor Barton is best known for his work on hybrid zones, often using the toad Bombina bombina as a study organism, and for extending the mathematical machinery needed to investigate multilocus genetics, a field in which he worked in collaboration with Michael Turelli. Research questions he has investigated include: the role of epistasis, the evolution of sex, speciation, and the limits on the rate of adaptation.

Barton moved to the University of Edinburgh in 1990, where he is said to have been instrumental in attracting to Edinburgh Brian and Deborah Charlesworth, with whom he had previously collaborated, thus complementing the university's strong tradition in quantitative genetics and population genetics and helping the University of Edinburgh to continue as one of the most important research institutions in evolutionary genetics worldwide. Barton was made a professor in 1994. In 2008 Barton moved to Klosterneuburg (Austria) where he became the first professor at the Institute of Science and Technology Austria.

In 2007, Barton, along with Derek E.G. Briggs, Jonathan A. Eisen, David B. Goldstein, and Nipam H. Patel, collaborated to create Evolution, an undergraduate textbook which integrates molecular biology, genomics, and human genetics with traditional evolutionary studies.

Awards and honours

2013 Erwin Schrödinger Prize
2013 Mendel Medal, Leopoldina
2009 Darwin–Wallace Medal
2006 Darwin Medal
1998 President's Award (joint with Mark Kirkpatrick), American Society of Naturalists
1995 Fellow of the Royal Society of Edinburgh
1994 Fellow of the Royal Society
1994 David Starr Jordan Prize (joint with S. Pacala)
1992 Scientific Medal, Zoological Society
1985 Bicentenary Medal of the Linnean Society

References

1955 births
Living people
Alumni of Peterhouse, Cambridge
Alumni of the University of East Anglia
Academics of University College London
Academics of the University of Edinburgh
British evolutionary biologists
Fellows of the Royal Society
Fellows of the Royal Society of Edinburgh
Members of the European Molecular Biology Organization
Population geneticists
20th-century British biologists
21st-century British biologists